Keller-Dorian cinematography was a French technique from the 1920s for filming movies in color, using a lenticular process to separate red, green and blue colors and record them on a single frame of black-and-white film. Keller-Dorian was primarily a manufacturer of paper and aluminum foil (tin foil). It was granted 38 patents. While researching how to create dies to color aluminum foil, they accidentally stumbled on this cinematography technique. This additive color system differs from other systems, for example Technicolor, which divided the colors into more than one frame on one or more pieces of film.

The system was used to film several scenes of Abel Gance's Napoléon (1927) and for La Femme et le pantin by Jacques de Baroncelli (1928). However, projection of this process in movie theaters seems to have been more difficult, so neither of these films was ever presented using this technique. Also, making prints was described by one source as "impossible."

This process was used by Eastman Kodak for the motion picture process Kodacolor, introduced in 1928 as the first amateur filmmaker's 16mm film color process available for the home movie market.

The company was founded by Albert Keller-Dorian and Léon Silvin, grandfather of Richard René Silvin. They were pioneers in employee benefits, and building housing compounds, which included low cost cafeterias adjacent to the factory in Lyon, France.

Upon the death of Léon Silvin in 1928, his sons, John Léon Silvin and Charles Silvin inherited the patents. In about 1929 Ludwig Blattner bought the rights for the use outside the USA of the Keller-Dorian process, and this process was then known as the Blattner Keller-Dorian process, which lost out to rival colour systems.

American writer Richard René Silvin (en), born in 1948, is the grandson of Albert Keller-Dorian's partner and the original establishments still exist under the name Keller-Dorian Graphics.

See also
 Color motion picture film
 List of film formats
 List of color film systems

References

External links
 Keller-Dorian on Timeline of Historical Film Colors with many written resources and many photographs of historical films.
 A list of various color film processes

Cinematography
Film and video technology
Motion picture film formats
Cinematic techniques